This is a list of compositions by the American composer George Whitefield Chadwick (1854–1931).


Stage
 The Peer and the Pauper (comic operetta, 2, R. Grant), 1884, unperformed
 A Quiet Lodging (operetta, 2, A. Bates), Boston, April 1, 1892
 Tabasco (burlesque op, 2, R.A. Barnet), 1893–4, Boston, Tremont, January 29, 1894 (includes material from The Peer and The Pauper)
 Judith (lyric drama, 3, W.C. Langdon, after scenario by Chadwick), concert performance, Worcester, Massachusetts, September 23, 1901
 Everywoman (incid music, W. Browne), New York, Herald Square, 1911
 The Padrone (tragic op, 2, D. Stevens, after scenario by Chadwick), 1912, unperformed
 Love’s Sacrifice (pastoral op, 1, Stevens), 1916–17, Chicago, February 1, 1923

Choir and orchestra
 Dedication Ode (H.B. Carpenter), S, A, T, B, SATB, orchestra, 1883
 Noël (Boston, 1888)
 Lovely Rosabelle (W. Scott), S, T, SATB, orchestra, 1889
 The Pilgrims (F.D. Hemans), SATB, orchestra, 1890
 Phoenix expirans (cant., Lat. hymn), S, A, T, B, SATB, orchestra, 1891
 Ode for the Opening of the Chicago World’s Fair (H. Monroe), S, T, SATB, wind ens, orchestra, 1892
 The Lily Nymph (Bates), S, T, B, B, SATB, orchestra, 1894–5
 Ecce jam noctis (J.G. Parker, after St Gregory), male vv, org, orchestra, 1897
 Noël (various texts), pastoral, solo vv, SATB, orchestra, 1907–8
 37 anthems, including Art Thou Weary
 19 choruses, male vv
 20 choruses, female vv

Instrumental

Symphonies
 Symphony No. 1 in C, 1881
 Symphony No. 2 in B♭, 1883–5
 Symphony No. 3 in F, 1893–4

Symphonic Poems
 Cleopatra, symphonic poem, 1904
 Aphrodite, symphonic fantasy, 1910–11
 Tam O’Shanter, symphonic ballad, 1914–15
 Angel of Death, symphonic poem, 1917–18

Overtures
 Rip Van Winkle, overture, 1879
 Thalia, overture, 1882
 The Miller’s Daughter, overture, 1886
 Melpomene, dramatic overture, 1887
 Adonais, overture, 1899
 Euterpe, overture, 1903
 Anniversary Overture, ?1922

Other orchestral works
 Pastorale Prelude, 1890
 Serenade for strings in F, 1890
 Tabasco March for band or orchestra, 1894
 Symphonic Sketches, Suite, A, 1895–1904
 Sinfonietta in D, 1904
 Suite symphonique in E♭, 1905–9
 Elegy, 1920
 3 Pezzi, 1923

Concertante Works
 Theme, Variations and Fugue, for organ and orchestra, 1908

Chamber
 String Quartet no.1, g, 1877?
 String Quartet no.2, C, 1878
 String Quartet no.3, D, 1885
 Piano Quintet, E-flat, 1887
 String Quartet no.4, e, 1896
 String Quartet no.5, d, 1898
 30 piano pieces
 8 organ pieces

Songs

Solo voice and orchestra
 Lochinvar (W. Scott), Bar, orchestra, 1896
 A Ballad of Trees and the Master (S. Lanier), low/medium v, orchestra, 1899, also version for voice and piano
 Aghadoe (ballad, J. Todhunter), A, orchestra, 1910
 The Curfew (H. Longfellow), low/medium v, orchestra, 1914?
 The Voice of Philomel (D. Stevens), 1914?
 The Fighting Men (M.A. DeWolfe Howe) (1918)
 Joshua (humorous song, R.D. Ware), 1919?
 Drake’s Drum (H. Newbolt), low/medium v, orchestra, 1920?

Solo voice and piano
 128 songs incl. 6 Songs, op.14 (Boston, 1885) [incl. The Danza (A. Bates)]
 3 Ballads (Boston, 1889)
 Bedouin Love Song (B. Taylor) (Boston, 1890)
 12 Songs of Brittany (Bates), arr. and harmonized (Boston, 1890)
 A Flower Cycle (Bates), 12 songs (Boston, 1892)
 12 Lyrics from Told in the Gate (Boston, Bates) (1897)
 4 Irish Songs (Boston, 1910)
 5 Songs (Stevens) (New York, 1914)
 3 Nautical Songs (Ware, H. Newbolt, A. Conan Doyle) (Boston, 1920)

References

External links
 Sebastiaan Geijtenbeek, George Whitefield Chadwick: List of Works

Chadwick, George Whitefield, List of compositions by